The Alfa Romeo 900AF is Italian trolleybus produced from 1955 to 1957.

History
The 900AF was the successor of the 800AF with more space for the passengers.

Construction
It uses bodies from Casaro and CRDA.

Transport
Operated in the network system in Milan, Bergamo, Brescia, Salerno, Trieste and La Spezia.

External links
 Alfa Romeo trolleybuses

900AF